Bare Lane is a railway station on the Morecambe Branch Line, which runs between  and . It is owned by Network Rail and managed by Northern Trains.

History
The station was opened as Poulton-le-Sands on 8 August 1864 by the London and North Western Railway, being renamed Bare Lane on 31 October 1864.

A level crossing with the public highway known as Bare Lane exists immediately to the west of the station, which until recently was controlled by the adjacent Bare Lane signal box, a fringe cabin to the Preston PSB Area. This box was closed on 8 December 2012, when the signalling equipment was renewed by Network Rail and control of the crossing switched to CCTV and transferred to Preston power box.

The old station building on the platform is now a private dwelling. It was auctioned to the public, and was featured on the BBC programme Homes Under the Hammer, a show about buildings which are auctioned to the public and redeveloped.

Layout
Although the station has two side platforms, the track layout through it is not the conventional double track used on most main & secondary routes, but two independent bi-directional single lines. Platform 1 serves the Up & Down Morecambe line (which is in effect a long siding all the way to the terminus), whilst platform 2 handles trains on what is now the Up & Down Heysham line. The two lines converge east of the station, but then immediately split into the single line curves toward  and towards Lancaster; the former sees only limited use, whereas the latter was double track until 1988 and is used by the vast majority of trains on the route.

As mentioned above however, it was closed in December 2012. The structure remained intact for another year and had been used for several months by Northern personnel as a staffed help point for travellers due to the absence of digital passenger information screens at the station. It was eventually demolished in January 2014 after the PIS screens were installed and finally brought into use.

The station is unstaffed and had no ticket facilities of any kind until recently - Northern has now installed a ticket vending machine as part of a programme of station improvements in the area. Waiting shelters are provided and both platforms have step-free access.

Services

The station is served by Northern Trains local services, which operate as a regular (hourly with some peak extras) Lancaster-Morecambe shuttle.

There are also a few longer-distance services (currently five per day Mon-Sat and on Sundays also since December 2019) from Morecambe to Skipton and Leeds via the Leeds to Morecambe Line. In addition, for many years the last train each weekday evening was a First TransPennine Express service from Windermere, which diverted from its route to Barrow-in-Furness. This service called at Lancaster, Bare Lane and Morecambe, before reversing, calling at Bare Lane again, then rejoining the West Coast Main Line and continuing via Carnforth thus avoiding the 1m 7ch section of the WCML between Hest Bank South Junction and Hest Bank North Junction.  This was the only scheduled service to use the original 1864 curve towards Hest Bank and as such functioned as a Parliamentary train to avoid the need for formal closure proceedings for this short stretch of line.  In the present (May 2019) timetable, just one early a.m Lancaster to Morecambe via Carnforth train takes this route to meet the TOC's franchise obligations.

References

External links 
 
 

Railway stations in Lancaster
DfT Category F1 stations
Former Lancaster and Carlisle Railway stations
Railway stations in Great Britain opened in 1864
Northern franchise railway stations
Morecambe